Elizabeth Der-zheng Wang (1912 – 30 November 2009) was a Chinese politician. She was among the first group of women elected to the Legislative Yuan in 1948.

Biography
Born in 1912, Wang was originally from Xiao County in Jiangsu province. She studied for a bachelor's degree in Chinese and English literature at National Central University, graduating in 1935. She then went to the United States, where she earned for a master's degree in English literature at the University of North Carolina in 1939, after which she was a graduate student in the Institute of Political Science of the Catholic University of America. Returning to China in 1940, she became a professor at Guangxi University, National Chengchi University. She married Ju-Yu Chang, with whom she had three sons.

A member of the Provisional Senate of Jiangsu province, Wang was a Kuomintang candidate in Jiangsu province in the 1948 elections for the Legislative Yuan, and was elected to parliament. She relocated to Taiwan during the Chinese Civil War, where she was a professor of English literature at Soochow University. She immigrated to Canada in 1993 to live at the Beechwood Manor care home in Waterloo, Ontario, where she died in 2009.

References

1912 births
National Central University alumni
University of North Carolina alumni
Catholic University of America alumni
Academic staff of Guangxi University
Academic staff of the National Chengchi University
Academic staff of Soochow University (Taiwan)
Kuomintang Members of the Legislative Yuan in Taiwan
Members of the 1st Legislative Yuan
Members of the 1st Legislative Yuan in Taiwan
Taiwanese emigrants to Canada
2009 deaths
20th-century Chinese women politicians